Hyochang Stadium is a multi-purpose stadium in Hyochang-dong, Yongsan-gu, Seoul, South Korea. It is currently used mostly for football matches.
The stadium has a capacity of 15,194 people. It was built in October 1960 for the 1960 AFC Asian Cup.

See also
Seoul World Cup Stadium
Jamsil Olympic Stadium
Mokdong Stadium
Dongdaemun Stadium

References

External links
 Seoul Sports Facilities Management Center 
 World Stadiums

Buildings and structures in Yongsan District
Sports venues in Seoul
Football venues in South Korea
Athletics (track and field) venues in South Korea
AFC Asian Cup stadiums
Multi-purpose stadiums in South Korea
Seoul Nowon United FC
Sports venues completed in 1960
1960 establishments in South Korea
20th-century architecture in South Korea